Lake Wayne formed in the Lake Erie and Lake St. Clair basins around 12,500 years before present (YBP) when Lake Arkona dropped in elevation. Based on work in Wayne County, near the village of Wayne evidence was found that Lake Wayne succeeded Lake Whittlesey and preceded Lake Warren. From the Saginaw Basin the lake did not discharge water through Grand River but eastward along the edge of the ice sheet to Syracuse, New York, thence into the Mohawk valley. This shift in outlets warranted a separate from Lake Warren. The Wayne beach lies but a short distance inside the limits of the Warren beach. Its character is not greatly different when taken throughout its length in Michigan, Ohio, Pennsylvania and New York. At the type locality in Wayne County, Michigan, it is a sandy ridge, but farther north, and to the east through Ohio it is gravel. The results of the isostatic rebound area similar to the Lake Warren beaches.

History
The Wayne beach is below the level of the Lake Warren beach. It appears to be the older, for it shows evidence of submergence and modification. The Wayne beach was submerged and modified during Lake Warren. The lowest stage of Lake Wayne may have coincided with the earliest stages of Lake Algonquin

Outlet
Lake Wayne was correlated with the Two Creeks Interstade and with eastward drainage into the Hudson River. Field studies in western New York are inconclusive. Based on studies of the Buffalo Moraine, the Alden Moraine, and the Niagara Falls Moraine it is believed that a local series of rapid glacial melting led to sand and gravel deposition, followed by an advance of the ice sheet. Because subdued pebble beach ridges, the Wayne Lake may have persisted until the ice margin had retreated north to near the Niagara Falls Moraine. This would raise the lake level to form the Warren III lake.

Beach
From the Ohio-Michigan line on the Black River to Port Huron the beach is very identifiable. It is composed of fine, partly wind-blown sand or is buried. The belt is mostly areas of dunes with swampy hollows.

See also
Proglacial lakes of the Lake Erie Basin

Lake Maumee
Lake Arkona
Lake Whittlesey
Lake Wayne
Lake Warren

Lake Grasmere
Early Lake Algonquin
Lake Lundy and Dana
Early Lake Erie
Lake Erie

References

Former lakes of the United States
Geology of Indiana
Geology of Ohio
Geology of Michigan
Geology of New York (state)
Geology of Pennsylvania
Geological history of the Great Lakes
Proglacial lakes
Lake Erie
Glacial lakes of Ohio
Glacial lakes of Canada